Xavier Tondo Volpini (5 November 1978 in Valls, Spain – 23 May 2011 in Monachil, Spain) was a Spanish professional road racing cyclist who specialized in mountain stages of bicycle races.

Death 

Tondo was killed after being apparently trapped between his own garage door and car, and crushed by the door, while preparing his bicycle for a training ride. Teammate Beñat Intxausti was with him at the time of the accident.

To commemorate Xavier Tondo the 100%Tondo sportive is held yearly, starting in Sant Joan les Fonts and finishing in Vallter 2000.

Doping refusal
In February 2011, it was reported that a pro cyclist had tipped off police about a doping ring. Tondo was later identified as that cyclist.

According to the Spanish newspaper El País, Tondo received an email in December 2010, which offered several doping products, including EPO, human growth hormone, Nandrolone, and Clenbuterol, all at low prices. Tondo gave the email to the police.

Palmarès 

 2002
 1st Stage 7 Tour of Qinghai Lake
 2005
 1st Overall Volta ao Alentejo
1st Stage 4
 1st Stage 3 Vuelta a Asturias
 2007
 1st Overall Troféu Joaquim Agostinho
1st Prologue
 1st Overall Volta a Portugal
 2008
 1st Subida al Naranco
 2009
 1st Stage 5 Tour de San Luis
 8th Overall Volta a Catalunya
2010
 1st Stage 6 Paris–Nice
 2nd Overall Volta a Catalunya
1st Stage 3
 5th Overall Vuelta a España
2011
 1st  Overall Vuelta a Castilla y León
 1st Stage 4 Tour de San Luis (ITT)
 5th Overall Tour of the Basque Country
 6th Overall Volta a Catalunya

See also
Professionals who died during training and other cycling related deaths

References

External links

100% Tondo commemorative sportive

1978 births
2011 deaths
People from Valls
Sportspeople from the Province of Tarragona
Spanish male cyclists
Accidental deaths in Spain
Volta a Portugal winners
Cyclists from Catalonia